Halv åtta hos mig (Swedish for Half past seven in my home) is a TV4 television programme shown in Sweden, first broadcast on 6 October 2008. The show is based on the ITV Studios television format Come Dine with Me broadcast on Channel 4 UK. The show has four amateur chefs competing against each other hosting a dinner party for the other contestants. Each competitor then rates the host's performance with the winner winning a 15,000 SEK cash prize. An element of comedy is added to the show through comedian Morgan Alling, who provides a sarcastic narration. The show was previously hosted by comedian Helge Skoog.

Series 1: Autumn 2008

The last four episodes of the first series were shown over two weeks on 1, 2, 8 and 9 December 2008. The final episode had 373,000 viewers.

Series 2: Spring 2009

Series 5: Autumn 2010

Series 6:  Spring 2011

Series 7: Autumn 2011

415,000 viewers watched the first episode of series 2, with 502,000 watching the final episode.

438,000 viewers watched the first episode of series 3, with 863,000 watching the final episode.

833,000 viewers watched the first episode of series 4, with 880,000 watching the episode shown on Wednesday 3 February 2010.

788, 000 viewers watched 5 October 2010 episode with a 24.8% share of all viewers. It was the most-watched non-news programme of the day.

References

2008 Swedish television series debuts
TV4 (Sweden) original programming
Swedish reality television series
Come Dine With Me
Swedish television series based on British television series